Ansel may refer to:

Places
Ansel, California
Ansel Adams Wilderness, California
Ansel Township, Cass County, Minnesota
Mount Ansel Adams, California

Other uses
Ansel (name), including a list of people with the name
ANSEL (American National Standard for Extended Latin), a character set used in text encoding
Ansel Adams Award (disambiguation), various awards
Nvidia Ansel, an Nvidia technology for taking screenshots in game engines

See also 
Ansell (disambiguation)
Anselm (disambiguation), the English form of the name
Anselmo (disambiguation), the Italian form of the name
Anselmus (disambiguation), the Latin form of the name